Joint valley landscape or fissure valley terrain is a type of relief common in Fennoscandia. The landscape originates from the erosion of joints in the bedrock which leaves out small plateaus or ridges in between. When the block summits in joint valley landscape are of different height it may indicate the past movement of a vertical geological fault. 

Karna Lidmar-Bergström identified joint valley landscape areas centered on Blekinge, Bohuslän, Linköping/Västervik, Stockholm and Hudiksvall. In the last three areas the flat summits of the landscapes are parts of the Sub-Cambrian peneplain. In addition to this there is a large-scale joint valley landscape that extends from the High Coast inland. The landscape type was first identified by Sten De Geer who in 1926 called it rutplatåland (lit. square plateau land). Joint valley landscapes are among the few places in southern Sweden where there are steep slopes in excess of 25°.

Gallery

References

Landforms of Finland
Landforms of Norway
Valleys of Norway
Landforms of Sweden
Valleys of Sweden